Linum flavum, the golden flax or yellow flax, is a species of flowering plant in the family Linaceae, native to central and southern Europe. The Latin flavum means "pure yellow".

In cultivation this plant requires sharply drained soil in a sunny position.  It is suitable for a rock garden or alpine garden. The cultivar 'Gemmell's Hybrid' has gained the Royal Horticultural Society's Award of Garden Merit.

References

flavum
Plants described in 1753
Taxa named by Carl Linnaeus
Flora of Europe